Windows Live Gallery (codenamed Customise) was a part of Windows Live range of services.  It was a center for gadgets, extensions and add-ons for Windows and Windows Live services.

Windows Live Gallery was officially retired on October 1, 2011.

History
Since its launch on July 24, 2006, Windows Live Gallery held repository for the following Windows and Windows Live services and products:

Developers
Windows Live Gallery integrated the Microsoft Points micropayment system which also powers Zune and Xbox Live purchases. It created a marketplace for developers to showcase their works, and if chose to, receive payment for their efforts. Developers who have partnered with Windows Live Gallery could set up their own virtual shops.

Jeff, Wei Jie, Junaid and Misha were generally regarded as the most prolific and critical members of the Gallery team.

See also
Windows Live
Windows Live Dev

References

External links
 Official website (Archive)
 Official website (Archive)

Gallery